Healey's Cornish Cyder Farm is a small independent family-run business in Penhallow near Truro, Cornwall, England, UK. It produces and sells its own cider, brandy, whisky, gin, eau de vie, country fruit wines and apple juice. Ciders include Cornish Rattler Cyder and Pear Rattler, which is made by adding pear juice to the original Cornish Rattler. In addition, the farm produces traditional scrumpy cider, reserve and classic cider, with the latter made in second hand oak whisky barrels. The farm also produces jams, marmalades, sauces, chutneys, pickle and mustard.

History of Healeys 

Healey's was opened to the general public in 1986 by David and Kay Healey, after they had been running an off-licence in Mevagissey. During their time managing an off-licence they realised how popular Cornish Cyder is, they initially began making Cyder for themselves at their smallholding near St Austell. The current site of the Cyder Farm is Penhallow near Truro, Cornwall. The original farm is over 150 years old, and had been a mixed arable and cattle farm.

The whisky was produced in a partnership with St Austell Brewery. It is the first commercial whisky to be produced in Cornwall in 300 years.

See also

 List of farms in Cornwall
Cider in the United Kingdom

References

Drink companies of the United Kingdom
Cider
English ciders
Cornish ciders
Companies based in Cornwall
Cider companies based in Cornwall
Cornish cuisine
Brandies
Tourist attractions in Cornwall
Farms in Cornwall